USS Kansas City (LCS-22) is an  of the United States Navy. She is the third ship to be named for Kansas City, the largest city in the U.S. state of Missouri.

Design
In 2002, the United States Navy initiated a program to develop the first of a fleet of littoral combat ships. The Navy initially ordered two trimaran hulled ships from General Dynamics, which became known as the  after the first ship of the class, . Even-numbered U.S. Navy littoral combat ships are built using the Independence-class trimaran design, while odd-numbered ships are based on a competing design, the conventional monohull . The initial order of littoral combat ships involved a total of four ships, including two of the Independence-class design. On 29 December 2010, the Navy announced that it was awarding Austal USA a contract to build ten additional Independence-class littoral combat ships.

Construction and career 
Kansas City was built in Mobile, Alabama by Austal USA. The ship was christened on 22 September 2018 in Mobile, Alabama, and sponsored by Tracy Davidson, wife of Admiral Philip S. Davidson. She was launched 19 October 2018 into the Mobile River.

Kansas City was commissioned on 20 June 2020 and she has been assigned to Littoral Combat Ship Squadron One.

References

 

Independence-class littoral combat ships
2018 ships